Miodrag Petrović (16 November 1946 – 29 November 2017) was a Yugoslav professional footballer who played as an attacking midfielder.

Career
While at Partizan, Petrović scored two goals in the 1966–67 Inter-Cities Fairs Cup.

References

External links
 

1946 births
2017 deaths
Yugoslav footballers
Association football midfielders
Bundesliga players
2. Bundesliga players
FK Partizan players
Standard Liège players
Kickers Offenbach players
1. FC Nürnberg players
Servette FC players
1. FC Köln players
SC Westfalia Herne players
SV Werder Bremen players
ASC Schöppingen players
Yugoslav expatriate footballers
Yugoslav expatriate sportspeople in Belgium
Expatriate footballers in Belgium
Yugoslav expatriate sportspeople in Germany
Expatriate footballers in Germany
Yugoslav expatriate sportspeople in Switzerland
Expatriate footballers in Switzerland